The Federal University of Amapá (UNIFAP) is a Brazilian public institution which is located in Macapá, Brazil.

References

External links

 Official website 

Amapa
Educational institutions established in 1990
1990 establishments in Brazil
Macapá